Michael Cochrane (born 13 August 1991) is a New Zealand hurdler. He competed in the 400 metres hurdles event at the 2015 World Championships in Beijing without qualifying for the final. His personal best in the 400 metres hurdles is 49.58 seconds set in Beijing in 2015. This is the former national record.

Competition record

References

External links

1991 births
Living people
New Zealand male hurdlers
World Athletics Championships athletes for New Zealand
Place of birth missing (living people)